Nicholas Dowd (born May 27, 1990) is an American professional ice hockey forward for the Washington Capitals of the National Hockey League (NHL). He was selected by the Los Angeles Kings in the 7th round (198th overall) of the 2009 NHL Entry Draft.

A native of Huntsville, Alabama, Dowd is the third NHL player (after Jared Ross and Aud Tuten) who is from the state of Alabama.

Playing career
Born to English parents, Dowd grew up in Huntsville, Alabama where he played junior hockey Dowd moved to Wenatchee, Washington to play for the Wenatchee Wild in the North American Hockey League (NAHL).  The following season he played for the Indiana Ice in Indianapolis, Indiana, before joining the St. Cloud State Huskies in the NCAA Men's Division I National Collegiate Hockey Conference (NCHC). In his senior year, Dowd's outstanding play was rewarded with a selection to the inaugural 2013–14 All-NCHC First Team  as well as being a finalist for the Hobey Baker Award.  He finished his college career with 52 goals and 69 assists for 121 points in 155 games played.

On April 1, 2014, the Los Angeles Kings of the National Hockey League (NHL) signed Dowd to an entry-level contract, assigning him to their American Hockey League (AHL) affiliate, the Manchester Monarchs. During the 2015–16 season, he made his NHL debut on March 22, 2016, and played 5 games before returning to the Ontario Reign. He recorded his first career NHL goal the following season on October 20, 2016, against the Dallas Stars.

In the 2017–18 season, on December 7, 2017, the Los Angeles Kings traded Dowd to the Vancouver Canucks in exchange for Jordan Subban. He remained on the Canucks roster to play out the season, posting 3 goals in 40 games.

As a free agent from the Canucks, Dowd agreed to a one-year, $650,000 contract with reigning Stanley Cup champions, the Washington Capitals, on July 1, 2018. On April 11, 2019, he signed a three-year contract extension with the Capitals.

Dowd played on the Capitals fourth line with Garnet Hathaway and Carl Hagelin throughout the 2020-21 NHL season.

On November 14, 2021, Dowd signed a three-year, $3.9 million contract extension with the Capitals.

Personal life
He married his wife Paige Dowd (formerly Kraemer), whom he met while studying at St. Cloud State University, on August 11, 2017.

Career statistics

Awards and achievements

References

External links

1990 births
Living people
American men's ice hockey centers
American people of English descent
Ice hockey people from Alabama
Indiana Ice players
Los Angeles Kings draft picks
Los Angeles Kings players
Manchester Monarchs (AHL) players
Ontario Reign (AHL) players
Sportspeople from Huntsville, Alabama
St. Cloud State Huskies men's ice hockey players
Vancouver Canucks players
Washington Capitals players
Culver Academies alumni
AHCA Division I men's ice hockey All-Americans